John Mawhinney (Jack) Woods
was Provost of St Andrew's Cathedral, Inverness from 1975 to 1980

Woods was born in 1919, educated at Edinburgh Theological College  and ordained in 1959. After a curacy in Kirkcaldy he was Rector of Walpole St Peter from 1960 until his appointment as Provost.

He died in Downham Market on 4 June 2009.

Notes

1919 births
Alumni of Edinburgh Theological College
Provosts of Inverness Cathedral
2009 deaths
People from Walpole, Norfolk